The 2013 FC Aktobe season was the 13th successive season that the club played in the Kazakhstan Premier League, the highest tier of association football in Kazakhstan. Aktobe won the League title for the first time since 2009, qualifying for the UEFA Champions League. Aktobe also reached the Semifinal of the Kazakhstan Cup and the Play-off Round of the Europa League.

Squad

Transfers

Winter

In:

Out:

Summer

In:

Out:

Competitions

Kazakhstan Premier League

First round

Results summary

Results by round

Results

League table

Championship Round

Results summary

Results by round

Results

Table

Kazakhstan Cup

UEFA Europa League

Qualifying rounds

Squad statistics

Appearances and goals

|-
|colspan="14"|Players who appeared for Aktobe that left during the season:

|}

Goal scorers

Disciplinary record

References

FC Aktobe seasons
Aktobe
Akt